Barryl Biekman (born 1950, Paramaribo) is a Surinamese-born Dutch politician.

See also
List of Dutch politicians

References

1950 births
Living people
People from Paramaribo
Democrats 66 politicians
Leiden University alumni